Restitution Inattendue (A Resourceful Waiter) is a 1902 French comedy film of unknown director.

Synopsis
At the restaurant, a customer orders a soup and steak. While the waiter is busy and making soup, a dog steals his steak from him. The waiter calls the dog and coaxes him to return the steak.

The waiter then serves the food to the customer. At the end, the customer finds the steak tough and annoying.

References

External links
 

1900s French-language films
1902 films
French silent short films
1902 comedy films
1902 short films
French comedy short films
French black-and-white films
Silent comedy films
1900s French films